Ravilloles is a commune in the Jura department in the region of Bourgogne-Franche-Comté in eastern France.

Population

See also
Communes of the Jura department

References

External links
La Vie á Ravilloles, local Facebook page

Communes of Jura (department)